Diplolaemus is a genus of lizards in the family Leiosauridae. The genus is endemic to southern South America.

Species
Diplolaemus contains the following four species:
Diplolaemus bibronii Bell, 1843 – Bibron's iguana
Range: Argentina (Patagonia from Santa Cruz to Aysén and Magallanes), Chile
Diplolaemus darwinii Bell, 1843 – Darwin's iguana
Range: Argentina (Patagonia, Santa Cruz), Chile
Diplolaemus leopardinus (F. Werner, 1898) – leopard iguana
Range: Argentina (Patagonia, Neuquen)
Diplolaemus sexcinctus Cei, Scolaro & Videla, 2003
Range: Argentina, Chile

References

Further reading
Bell T (1843). In: Darwin C (1843). The Zoology of the Voyage of the H.M.S. Beagle, Under the Command of Captain Fitzroy, R.N., During the Years 1832 to 1836. Part V. Reptiles. London: Smith, Elder and Co. vi + 50 pp. + Plates 1-20. (Diplolæmus, new genus, p. 19).
Boulenger GA (1885). Catalogue of the Lizards in the British Museum (Natural History). Second Edition. Volume II. Iguanidæ ... London: Trustees of the British Museum (Natural History). (Taylor and Francis, printers). xiii + 497 pp. + Plates I-XXIV. (Genus Diplolæmus, p. 125).

Diplolaemus
Endemic reptiles of South America
Lizard genera
Taxa named by Thomas Bell (zoologist)